Cristal (1985–1986) is a Venezuelan telenovela written by Delia Fiallo and produced by Radio Caracas Televisión. This telenovela lasted 246 episodes, and it achieved a significant amount of success inside and outside Venezuela, it was extremely successful in its airing in Spain (where each advertisement that was seen during the transmission of Cristal cost more than seven million pesetas) and Italy.  It was distributed internationally by Coral International. Cristal has been rebroadcast more than seven times in Venezuela. Cristal has several adaptations, including a 2006 Brazilian version of the same name distributed by SBT, and two Mexican remakes, El Privilegio de Amar in 1998, and Triunfo del Amor in 2010, both distributed by Televisa.

Lupita Ferrer, Jeannette Rodríguez and Carlos Mata starred as the main protagonists with Marita Capote, Jorge Palacios and Zoe Ducós as the antagonists.

Synopsis
Victoria Ascano (Lupita Ferrer), the beautiful and successful owner of the fashion house "Casa Victoria", decides to search for the baby she abandoned years before. At the same time, Cristina (Jeannette Rodríguez), Victoria's daughter leaves the orphanage where she was raised and moves into an apartment with two other girls, Inocencia (Mariela Alcala) and Zoraida (Lourdes Valera), ready to pursue her dream of becoming a model. Cristina is unknowingly hired by Victoria, and she was on her way to becoming a successful model when Victoria discovers that Cristina and Luis Alfredo (Carlos Mata), her stepson, were having an affair. Victoria fires Cristina and Luis Alfredo marries Marion (Marita Capote), his old girlfriend, because she claims to be carrying his child. Shortly after being abandoned by Luis Alfredo and fired by Victoria, Cristina discovers that she, too, is pregnant.

Cast
Lupita Ferrer as Victoria Ascanio
Jeannette Rodríguez as Cristina Expósito, a.k.a. Cristal
Carlos Mata as Luis Alfredo Ascanio
Raul Amundaray as Alejandro Ascanio
Marita Capote as Marion Bellorin
Mariela Alcala as Inocencia
Lourdes Valera as Zoraida, a.k.a. Cerebrito
Henry Zakka as Adán
Zoe Ducós as Luisa
Lino Ferrer as Piero
Ileana Jacket as Bertha Girot
Roberto Moll as Darío
Jorge Palacios as Gonzalo Valladares
Humberto Garcia as Padre Ángel de Jesús
Gigi Zanchetta as Eliana Ascanio
Cecilia Villarreal as Vivian Marshall
Sonya Smith as Maggie
Marlene Maseda as Marlene

Broadcasters

See also
List of famous telenovelas

References

External links
Cristal at the Internet Movie Database
Opening Credits

1985 telenovelas
RCTV telenovelas
Venezuelan telenovelas
1985 Venezuelan television series debuts
1986 Venezuelan television series endings
Spanish-language telenovelas
Television shows set in Caracas